Shades of gray or shades of grey refers to variations of the color gray.

Shades of gray, Shades of grey or variations may also refer to:

Film and television
 Shades of Gray, a 1948 documentary produced as part of the U.S. Army's Professional Medical Film series
 "Shades of Gray" (Heroes), the nineteenth episode of the third season
 "Shades of Gray" (Star Trek: The Next Generation), the twenty-second episode of the second season
 "Shades of Gray", the tenth episode of the first season of Danny Phantom
 "Shades of Gray", episode 110 of the seventh season of Homicide: Life on the Street
 "Shades of Grey", the fourth episode of the second season of The Joy of Painting
 "Shades of Grey", the eighteenth episode of the third season of Stargate SG-1
 "Shades of Gray", the sixth episode of of the first season of Voltron: The Third Dimension

Literature
 Shades of Gray, a superhero novel by Jackie Kessler and Caitlin Kittredge
 Shades of Gray (Reeder novel), 1989 children's historical novel by Carolyn Reeder
 Shades of Gray Comics and Stories, a comic book written and drawn by Jimmy Gownley
 Shades of Grey: Glasgow, 1956–1986, a collection of photographs by Oscar Marzaroli including an essay by William McIlvanney
 Shades of Grey, a 2009 novel by Jasper Fforde

Music
 Shades of Gray (The Choir album), an EP released by Christian alternative rock band the Choir
 Shades of Grey (Al Grey album), a 1965 album by jazz trombonist Al Grey
 Shades of Grey, the second studio album by hip-hop artist Braille
 Shades of Grey, the 4th studio album by US ethereal wave band Autumn's Grey Solace
 "Shades of Gray" (song), a song by The Monkees
 "Shades of Gray", a song by Amanda Marshall from her album Tuesday's Child
 "Shades of Grey", a song by Billy Joel from his album River of Dreams
 "Shades of Gray", a song by Robert Earl Keen from Picnic
 "Shades of Grey", a song by Sam Sparro from Return to Paradise
 "Shades of Grey", a song by Symphony X from their self-titled album
 "Shades of Gray", a song by Amorphis from Circle
 "Shades of Gray", a song by Black Label Society from Catacombs of the Black Vatican
 "Shades of Grey", a song by Drake Bell
 "Shades of Grey", a song by Overkill from the album I Hear Black 
 “Shades of Grey”, a song by Oliver Heldens
 "Shades of Gray”, a song by supergroup Cry Cry Cry from the 1998 eponymous album

See also
 14 Shades of Grey, the 4th studio album by US rock band Staind
 Fifty Shades of Grey (disambiguation)
 Grayscale
 Grey area (disambiguation)
 Splitting (psychology)